David Serrano (born 11 October 1968) is a Spanish badminton player. He competed in the men's singles tournament at the 1992 Summer Olympics.

References

1968 births
Living people
Spanish male badminton players
Olympic badminton players of Spain
Badminton players at the 1992 Summer Olympics
Place of birth missing (living people)